Demogenes is a genus of crab spiders that was first described by Eugène Louis Simon in 1895.

Species
 it contains five species, found on Vanuatu, in Papua New Guinea, and on the Andaman Islands:
Demogenes andamanensis (Tikader, 1980) – India (Andaman Is.)
Demogenes conivulvus (Balogh, 1936) – New Guinea
Demogenes heterophthalmus (Berland, 1938) – Vanuatu
Demogenes lugens (Thorell, 1881) (type) – New Guinea
Demogenes simplicibulbis (Balogh, 1936) – New Guinea

See also
 List of Thomisidae species

References

Further reading

Araneomorphae genera
Spiders of Oceania
Thomisidae